A Curious Feeling is the debut solo album from English keyboardist Tony Banks. It was recorded at ABBA's Polar Music Studios during a brief hiatus for Banks's main group Genesis and released in 1979 on Charisma Records. It is one of only two of Banks' solo albums to have entered the UK Albums Chart, reaching 21 and staying on the chart for five weeks. The album is a loose adaptation of the 1966 Daniel Keyes novel Flowers for Algernon. Its cover was designed by Hothouse and contains Wuluwait - Boatman of the Dead by Australian artist Ainslie Roberts. It was digitally remastered in 2009.

History
The instrumental piece "From the Undertow" was used in the 1978 British film The Shout, for which Banks, with Mike Rutherford, composed the incidental music. No soundtrack of the film has been released. The piece was originally intended to be the intro to "Undertow" from the Genesis album ...And Then There Were Three... (hence the title).

The album was re-released on 19 October 2009, remixed from the original masters by Nick Davis, who also created a 5.1 DTS 96/24 surround mix which is available on the second disc of the deluxe edition.

Reception

According to Banks himself, the album "got some extremely scathing reviews, I don't think they were fair" but he conceded "this was post-punk and this was really not the album that people wanted to hear". Classic Rock reviewer Jerry Ewing agrees with Banks, writing that the album is made of "lush pastoral English prog rock that deserved better at the time" and is probably the musician's best solo effort.

AllMusic gave a positive retrospective review, asserting that "Banks manages to capture the wonderment and allure that enveloped Genesis' Peter Gabriel days... yet he filters out the instrumental intricacies, unorthodox time signatures, and complex poetry which enveloped these works to create a milder but equally effective progressive realm [sic]." They praised the album for lacking the instrumental pretentiousness that most would have expected, instead focusing on strong progressive rock compositions.

Track listing

Personnel 
 Tony Banks – keyboards, guitars, bass, percussion
 Chester Thompson – drums, percussion
 Kim Beacon – vocals

Production 
 Tony Banks – producer 
 David Hentschel – producer, engineer 
 David Bascombe – engineer 
 Geoff Banks – equipment
 Andy Mackrill – equipment
 Dale Newman – equipment
 Hothouse – design 
 Ainslie Roberts – cover painting

Charts
Album

References

1979 debut albums
Tony Banks (musician) albums
Albums produced by David Hentschel
Albums produced by Tony Banks (musician)
Caroline Records albums
Charisma Records albums
Albums recorded at Polar Studios